The Platypezoidea are a superfamily of true flies of the section Aschiza. Their closest living relatives are the Syrphoidea, which, for example, contain the hoverflies. Like these, the adults do not burst open their pupal cases with a ptilinum when hatching, thus the Aschiza do not have the inverted-U-shaped suture above the antennae. They are, however, muscomorphs, thus have a particular type of pupal case resembling a rounded barrel and called puparium.

Families
Five families are placed in the Platypezoidea, listed below in taxonomic sequence:

 Phoridae - coffin and scuttle flies (includes Sciadoceridae)
 Opetiidae - flat-footed flies
 Ironomyiidae - ironic flies
 Lonchopteridae - spear-winged flies, pointed-wing flies
 Platypezidae - flat-footed flies

The Ironomyiidae, Lonchopteridae, and Phoridae are sometimes separated as Phoroidea. The reduced Platypezoidea thus created unites the two families of flat-footed flies.

References

 
Diptera superfamilies